Dalisandus or Dalisandos was an ancient city and bishopric in eastern Pamphylia, in Asia Minor (Anatolia, Asian Turkey) and remains a Latin titular see.

It was situated near Lake Seydişehri in Turkey.

History 
This Dalisandus is not mentioned in the Synecdemus, which does mention another Dalisandus in Isauria. However, it is included in the Notitiae Episcopatuum of the Patriarchate of Constantinople as a suffragan see of Side, the capital of the late Roman province of Pamphylia Prima.

Titular see 
No longer a residential bishopric, Dalisandus in Pamphylia is today listed by the Catholic Church as a Latin titular bishopric since the diocese was nominally restored in 1933.

It is vacant for decades, having had the following incumbents of the fitting Episcopal (lowest) rank:

 Bishop-elect Gérard-Paul-Louis-Marie de Milleville, Holy Ghost Fathers (C.S.Sp.) (1955.05.08 – 1955.09.14), as Apostolic Vicar of Conakry (Guinea) (1955.05.08 – 1955.09.14), promoted first Metropolitan Archbishop of above Conakry (1955.09.14 – 1962.03.10), also Apostolic Administrator of Apostolic Prefecture of Kankan (Guinea) (1957 – 1958.12.14); later Titular Archbishop of Gabala (1962.03.10 – 2007.01.12) as Auxiliary Bishop of Fortaleza (Brazil) (1967 – 1984) and Apostolic Administrator of Basse-Terre (Guadeloupe, French Antilles) (1968.01.29 – 1970.10.05), died 2007
 Rudolf Johannes Maria Koppmann, Missionary Oblates of Mary Immaculate (O.M.I.) (1957.01.26 – 2007.06.24) as Coadjutor Apostolic Vicar of Windhoek (Namibia) (1957.01.26 – 1961.03.20) and having succeeded as Apostolic Vicar of above Windhoek (1961.03.20 – retired 1980.11.29), died 2007.

See also
 Dalisandus in Isauria

References

Sources and references 
 GCatholic
 Raymond Janin, lemma '2. Dalisandos', in Dictionnaire d'Histoire et de Géographie ecclésiastiques, vol. XIV, 1960, coll. 26-27

Populated places in ancient Pamphylia
Ancient Greek archaeological sites in Turkey
Roman towns and cities in Turkey
Catholic titular sees in Asia
Populated places of the Byzantine Empire
Former populated places in Turkey
Lost ancient cities and towns